Jim Fleming (born September 23, 1959) is an American college football coach and former player. He is currently the head coach at the University of Rhode Island (URI), a position he assumed in December 2013. Fleming served in the same capacity at Sacred Heart University (SHU) from 2000 to 2001 where he compiled a record of 21 wins and one loss. Prior to his appointment at URI, he was the defensive coordinator at the University of Central Florida (UCF) from 2012 to 2013.

Coaching career
Fleming served as the head coach for two seasons at Sacred Heart University from 2000 to 2001 and compiled an overall record of 21–1. He led the Pioneers to the program's first conference title in 2001 and first bowl appearance/win, also in 2001. His 2001 Pioneer team also was crowned as the Mid-Major National Champs after defeating Duquesne University.

The University of Rhode Island announced on December 20, 2013, that it had hired Fleming as the 20th football head coach in school history.

Head coaching record

References

External links
 Rhode Island profile

1959 births
Living people
American football tight ends
Akron Zips football coaches
Boise State Broncos football coaches
Brown Bears football coaches
East Carolina Pirates football coaches
Kent State Golden Flashes football coaches
North Carolina Tar Heels football coaches
Rhode Island Rams football coaches
Sacred Heart Pioneers football coaches
Sewanee Tigers football players
South Carolina Gamecocks football coaches
UCF Knights football coaches
Villanova Wildcats football coaches
Coaches of American football from New York (state)
Players of American football from New York City